Greying may refer to:

 Greying (hair), an effect of aging on hair color
 Greying (album), a 2014 album by The Banner